Erik Edvin Beijar (15 May 1921, in Vaasa – 8 November 1993, in Vaasa) was a Finnish footballer who competed in the 1952 Summer Olympics.

References

External links

1921 births
1993 deaths
Finnish footballers
Olympic footballers of Finland
Footballers at the 1952 Summer Olympics
Association football midfielders
Finland international footballers
Vasa IFK players
Sportspeople from Vaasa